Erminia, Tancredi, Polidoro e Pastore (R.374.26) or more simply Erminia, is the last of the serenades by Italian composer Alessandro Scarlatti. Conceived for four voices, choir and orchestra, the work was created on the occasion of a wedding at the Palazzo Zevallos Stigliano in Naples on June 13, 1723, two years before the musician's death. The second part has gone astray in time and long considered lost or as an unfinished work. In the 2010s, fragments were found thanks to the Répertoire international des sources musicales.

The work has been performed several times in recent years, notably by the Concerto de' Cavalieri and its conductor, Marcello di Lisa and in early 2018, by the Opera Lafayette with Julia Dawson in the title-role.

History 
Erminia was commissioned on the occasion of the marriage between two great Neapolitan families, the Colonna, princes of Stigliano (Ferdinando) and Caracciolo de Santobono (Maria Luisa Caracciolo). Edward Dent considered the work as unfinished.

The composer's name is not mentioned in the material except in the contemporary Gazzetta di Napoli and on page five of the libretto, but the author of the text does not appear anywhere. The only known copy of the libretto, discovered in 1973 by Ulisse Prota-Giurleo, is kept at the Biblioteca Casanatense in Rome. Roberto Pagano suggests that the author of the text may be Pietro Metastasio,  insofar as the most famous librettist of the 18th century was united by a deep friendship - caro gemello - with Carlo Broschi, i. e. Farinelli, who held the title role during the creation at just eighteen years. During his law studies in Naples between 1721 and 1723, Metastasio wrote some libretti inspired by antiquity, played in Naples: Angelica (1720), Endimione, Gli Orti esperidi (1721), Galatea (1722) and a few months before Scarlatti's work, La Forza della virtù. The author later rejected the early works cited above, particularly for the publication by Bettinelli, his Venetian publisher in 1733–1734. However, there are other possible authors for Erminia, in particular Silvio Stampiglia who, on retirement, lived in Naples at the time.

The other singers were Don Antonio Manna, a member of the Royal Chapel of Naples, and accustomed to comic roles in the Teatro San Bartolomeo (in 1708 he interpreted the demanding role of Polifemo in Handel's Aci, Galatea e Polifemo); Andrea Pacini another alto castrat (who had sung Vivaldi's Orlando furioso, Scarlatti's Griselda and Marco Attilio Regolo and later Scipion by Vinci and Rodelinda by Handel in London).

Like many oratorios of the time, the Serenata is in two parts. In this case, the work borrows more from the dramatic cantata than it pulls towards the opera, while the singers were always in costume, according to their role,  For the oratorio, the break between the two parts was intended for the sermon, in the case of the serenata, it was an invitation to the consumption of fine food and drinks.

With Erminia, the composer, still considered in 1723 as a living artistic force, brings the best of the late Baroque musical tradition, reconciling it in a unique way with many styles and trends of the early 18th century.

Roles and setting 
Erminia, serenata a quattro voci con vari strumenti, Naples 1723

The orchestra is composed of two flutes, two oboes, a bassoon, two trumpets (or horns), violins I and II, viola, cello, double bass and harpsichord. The choir is in four voices (SSAT).

The duration of the first part is about 40 minutes.

Synopsis 
The story of Erminia borrows its argument from Jerusalem Delivered by Torquato Tasso (1575, Canto VII: Pastoral Care of Erminia). The action takes place in the countryside of Soria, on the banks of the Jordan River. Erminia, a Muslim princess, betrays her city for love of the invading Christian knight, Tancredi. But this one is in love with Clorinda. Erminia, jealous, disguises herself with Clorinda's armor in search of her lover.

The second part ends with a general celebration (commanded by the wedding ceremony). The librettist leaves Tasso and in order to unite the lovers Erminia and Tancredi, turns to Dante for inspiration — Canto V — where Francesca da Rimini (accompanied by Paolo Malatesta) tells the poet their story.

First part 

Erminia Fuggitiva
 [Introduction]
 Ove smarrita e sola (recitativo), Erminia
 Al dolce nome (aria)
 Poiché già chiaro (recitativo)
 [Sinfonia da lontano]
 Qual odo in lontananza  (recitativo)
 Cinta di rose (choir)
 D'innocente fanciulli (recitativo), Erminia
 A pascolar l'agnelle (choir)
 Se di piacere alcuno (recitativo)
 Ma di rustico albergo (recitativo), Erminia, Pastore
 Mentre quel solco (aria), Pastore
 Tra fortunati vostri alberghi (recitativo), Erminia, Pastore
 Vado al gregge (duo), Erminia, Pastore
 In van credete (recitativo), Polidoro
 Finché il fulmine (aria), Polidoro
 Da quelle, che sul verde ameno prato (recitativo), Polidoro, Erminia
 Son raminga pastorella (aria), Erminia
 Troppo gentil tu sei (recitativo), Polidoro, Erminia
 Come suol veloce ardito (aria), Tancredi
 Così dal ferro ostil (recitativo), Tancredi, Pastore
 Quando irato il toro mugge (aria), Pastore
 Tancredi, e dove mai così ansante (recitativo), Polidoro, Tancredi
 Ha nei begl'occhi (aria), Polidoro
 Mentre albergo e ristoro cerchi (recitativo), Polidoro, Tancredi
 Di fortuna e d'Amore tra gl'inganni (aria), Tancredi
 Qui dove al germogliar (recitativo), Erminia
 Torbido, irato e nero (aria), Erminia.

Second part 
Tancredi, Pastore e Polidoro

Arias recovered.
 Che piacer! Che diletto! (recitativo) — GB-Lbl Add. 14209, folios 92r-99v
 Quando irato il toro mugge (aria), Pastore  — folios 106r-115v
 Mentre quel solco ara il bifolco — folios 116r-123r
 Vado al gregge e meco viene — folios 132r-145r
 Mentr’ella offesa langue (aria), Pastore, n° 38 du livret — GB-Lbl Add. 14166 folios 81r-83v

Manuscripts 
 First part
 Naples, Conservatoire San Pietro a Majella, (Cantata 269) 
 Monte Cassino, I-MC (5-F-9) 
 London, Royal College of Music, MS 577

 Second part
 London, British Library, GB-Lbl (Add. 14166) 
 London, British Library, GB-Lbl (Add. 14209, folios 92r-99v)

Modern scores 
 Erminia [part I], Thomas Edward Griffin, Rome, Istituto Italiano per la storia della musica 2010

References

Bibliography

External links 
 
 Libretto

Compositions by Alessandro Scarlatti
1723 compositions
Serenades